A.B. Normal College is a 2003 Philippine comedy film co-written and directed by Al Tantay. The film stars Andrew E., Ogie Alcasid and Mikey Arroyo.

Cast

 Andrew E. as Andres
 Ogie Alcasid as Dominic
 Mikey Arroyo as Miguel
 Rufa Mae Quinto as Miss Yulo
 Patricia Javier  as Pao
 Jen Rosendahl as Gregoria
 Rico J. Puno as Piolo
 Caloy Alde as Dean Jerico
 Lou Veloso as Carlos
 Manjo Del Mundo as Matthew
 Alicia Lane as Dra. Fortune
 Don Pepot as Esteban
 Whitney Tyson as Monang
 Romy Santos as Principal
 Cloyd Robinson as Charlie
 Boy Alano as Dominic's Father
 Elizabeth Oropesa as Miguel's Mother
 Al Tantay as Mrs. Salazar's Driver
 Cita Astals as Sarso's Mother
 Jose "Kaka" Balagtas as Drug Lord
 Anthony Suntay as Quiz Show Host
 Dan Salamante as Quiz Show Floor director
 Kristine Jaca as Pamela
 Chino Pamintuan as Sarso
 Joji dela Paz as Mang Ruffy
 Rey Solo as Bus Driver
 Nonoy De Guzman as Prisoner Alumni
 Doming Olivar as Security Guard
 Alexis Lagdameo as Bading
 Celestina Salazar as Mrs. Salazar

Production
Production of the film took 15 days in November 2002. The film was slated to be released in January the following year, but was later moved to a month later.

References

External links

2003 films
2003 comedy films
Filipino-language films
Philippine comedy films
Viva Films films
Films directed by Al Tantay